Manuel Legris is a French ballet dancer, born in Paris on October 10, 1964. He was an étoile (star dancer) of the Paris Opera Ballet for 23 years. On September 1, 2010, he began direction of the Vienna State Ballet. He was appointed artistic director of La Scala Theatre Ballet in December 2020.

Biography

Career as a dancer 
Manuel Legris started ballet lessons at the age of 8 under a local ballet teacher, Yvonne Guba. In 1976 at age 11, he started with the Paris Opera Ballet School and joined the Corps de Ballet at 16 years old in 1980. In 1981 he became "Coryphee", and was then promoted to "Sujet" in 1982. He finally was appointed the title "Etoile" on 11 July 1986, at age 21, by the Stage Director Rudolf Nureyev, bypassing the rank of "Premier Danseur." On that day, the company performed Raymonda, choreographed by Nureyev, at the Metropolitan Opera in New York, and Legris danced the leading role of Jean de Brienne.

Legris established his reputation in both classical and contemporary choreography, attracting the notice of choreographers such as William Forsythe, John Neumeier, Jiri Kylian, and Jerome Robbins, who continued to engage him. He also earned invitations to dance companies such as the Royal Ballet in London, the New York City Ballet, the Cuban National Ballet, and the Tokyo Ballet, as well as the Ballets of Monte-Carlo, Stuttgart, and Hamburg, where John Neumeier created Spring and Fall and A Cinderella Story especially for him.

Legris has performed all around the world, including in La Scala in Milan, the Met in New York, the Vienna State Opera Ballet, the Bolshoi in Moscow, and, most recently, the Mariinsky Theatre in St. Petersburg. While touring, he has partnered with Evelyn Hart, Dominique Khalfouni, Alessandra Ferri, Lorna Feijoo, and Diana Vishneva.

In 1996, Legris founded his own dance troupe, "Manuel Legris et ses Étoiles", as a collaboration Monique Loudières. The pair hoped to allow young dancers to reach the solo roles still inaccessible for them at the Opera by giving them a chance to work with leading choreographers. 

In 2003, Manuel Legris added two major works to his repertoire: Variations on Carmen by Roland Petit and Phrases of Quartet by Maurice Béjart. That same year, Béjart staged again The Song of a Wayfarer for Legris and Laurent Hilaire, giving them the exclusive performance.

In February 2004, Legris danced opposite Aurélie Dupont in Jiri Kylian's Pas de Deux, "Il faut qu'une porte...", at the Paris Opera. He then joined Trisha Brown's "O zlozony / O composite", with Dupont and Nicolas Le Riche.

In December 2005, the Stuttgart Ballet offered him the title role in Onegin where he danced opposite Maria Eichwald.

On November 19, 2007, he danced with Dorothée Gilbert, a favorite pupil of his, in "The Nutcracker" at the Opera de Paris, after which she was named Etoile.

He made his official farewell from the stage of the Opera Garnier on May 15, 2009. Many of his former partners, including Clairemarie Osta, Mathias Heymann and Myriam Ould-Braham, came to see him off, as did former ballet masters such as Claude Bessy and Pierre Lacotte, and the Culture and Communication Minister Christine Albanel.  He received a nearly 30 minute standing ovation after receiving the insignia of "Commandeur de l'Ordre des Arts et des Lettres".

Since his farewell, Legris took charge of the Vienna State Ballet. From 2010 to 2020, he directed numerous ballets for the company, including Rudolf Nureyev's Don Quixote, Onegin, and a Triple Bill devoted to Jerome Robbins. Legris stepped down from the Ballet after his contract ended in 2020 and assumed his current position of artistic director of La Scala Theatre Ballet.

Awards and distinctions 
 1984: Gold Medal of the International Dance Competition in Osaka with Elisabeth Maurin
 1985: Prix Carpeaux Circle
 1988: Nijinsky Award
 1993: Knight of Arts and of Letters
 1998: Prix Benois de la Danse
 1998: Officer of Arts and of Letters
 2000: Nijinsky Award for the second time
 2002: Knight of the Order of Merit
 2006: Knight of the Order of the Legion of Honour
 2009: Commandeur de l'Ordre des Arts et des Lettres

Filmography 
 Romeo and Juliet (Rudolf Nureyev)
 Le Spectre de la Rose (Michel Fokine)
 Notre-Dame de Paris (Roland Petit)
 L'Arlésienne (Roland Petit)
 The Sleeping Beauty (Rudolf Nureyev)
 Don Quixote (Rudolf Nureyev)
 Sylvia (John Neumeier)
 "Proust, ou les intermittences du coeur" (Roland Petit)

Bibliography 
 Kishin Shinoyama, Manuel Legris à l'Opéra de Paris

Repertory 
 Giselle, Paquita (classic version)
 Rhapsody, Meditation (pas de deux) (Sir Frederick Ashton)
 Agon, Tchaikovsky - Pas de deux, Le Palais de Cristal, Themes and Variations, The Four Temperaments, Divertimento No. 15, The Prodigal Son, Violin Concerto, Who cares?, Stars and Stripes, Sonatine, Jewels (George Balanchine)
 Coppélia (Patrice Bart)
 Arepo, The Contest, The Song of a Wayfarer, Phrases Quartet (Maurice Béjart)
 Swan Lake (Vladimir Bourmeister)
 Napoli (August Bournonville)
 O złożony / O composite (Trisha Brown)
 Les Indomptés (Claude Brumachon)
 Onegin (John Cranko)
 Blues du poisson rouge (Pierre Darde)
 Giselle (Mats Ek)
 In The Middle, Somewhat Elevated, Wound-Work (William Forsythe)
 Le Spectre de la Rose (Michel Fokine)
 Bacchanale (Andy Degroat)
 Tantz-Schul, Sinfonietta, Clouds, Sweet Lies, Bella Figura, Il faut qu'une porte... (Jiri Kylian)
 Giselle, La Sylphide, Paquita (Pierre Lacotte)
 Études (Harald Lander)
 The Wayward Daughter (Joseph Lazzini)
 Suite en blanc, Les Mirages, Romeo and Juliet pas de deux (Lifar)
 The Story of Manon, Romeo and Juliet (Sir Kenneth MacMillan)
 A Midsummer Night's Dream, Vaslaw, Magnificat, The Nutcracker, Sylvia, Spring and Fall, A Cinderella Story (John Neumeier).
 Don Quixote, Raymonda, The Nutcracker, Swan Lake, Romeo and Juliet, The Sleeping Beauty, Cinderella, La Bayadere (Rudolf Nureyev)
 Notre-Dame de Paris, L'Arlesienne, Carmen, Les Intermittences du coeur, Cheek to Cheek, Variations from Carmen (Roland Petit)
 Le Park (Angelin Preljocaj)
 Dances at a Gathering, In The Night, The Four Seasons, A Suite of Dances, Other Dances (Jerome Robbins).
 Rules of The Game (Twyla Tharp)
 Continuo, Lilac Garden, The Leaves Are Fading (Antony Tudor)
 Four Last Songs (Rudi van Dantzig)
 Angel, Alles Walz (Renato Zanella)
 Proust ou les intermittences du coeur (Roland Petit)

References

External links 
 Biography in the Vienna State Ballet official website (in German)
 
 Manuel Legris Official Website
 Article from danceviewtimes
 Article from LE FIGARO.fr

French male ballet dancers
Paris Opera Ballet étoiles
Recipients of the Legion of Honour
Chevaliers of the Légion d'honneur
Chevaliers of the Ordre des Arts et des Lettres
1964 births
Living people
Prix Benois de la Danse winners